This is a list of cases reported in volume 1 of United States Reports (1 Dall.), decided by various Pennsylvania courts from 1754 to 1789.

Introduction

Alexander Dallas and Dallas Reports 
None of the cases reported in 1 U.S. (1 Dall.) are from the Supreme Court of the United States. They are decisions from various appellate and trial courts from the years 1754–1789, before and after the American Revolution, from the colonial Province of Pennsylvania and the post-independence Commonwealth of Pennsylvania.

Alexander J. Dallas, a Philadelphia lawyer and later United States Secretary of the Treasury, had been in the business of reporting local law cases for newspapers and periodicals. When the US Supreme Court sat in Philadelphia from 1791–1800, he collected their cases as well, and later began compiling his case reports in a bound volume which he called Reports of cases ruled and adjudged in the courts of Pennsylvania, before and since the Revolution.

When the US Supreme Court along with the rest of the new federal government moved in 1791 from the former capital, New York City, to the nation's temporary capital in Philadelphia, Dallas was appointed the Supreme Court's first unofficial and unpaid Supreme Court Reporter. (Court reporters in that age received no salary, but were expected to profit from the publication and sale of their compiled decisions.) Dallas continued to collect and publish Pennsylvania and other decisions, adding federal Supreme Court cases to his reports. Dallas published four volumes of decisions during his tenure as Reporter, known as the Dallas Reports.

Nominative Reports 
In 1874, the U.S. government created the United States Reports, and retroactively numbered older privately-published case reports as part of the new series. As a result, cases appearing in volumes 1–90 of U.S. Reports have dual citation forms; one for the volume number of U.S. Reports, and one for the volume number of the reports named for the relevant reporter of decisions (these are called "nominative reports"). As such, volumes 1–4 of United States Reports correspond to volumes 1–4 of Dallas Reports. The dual citation form of, for example, Kennedy v. Fury is 1 U.S. (1 Dall.) 72 (Pa. 1783).

Courts in 1 U.S. (1 Dall.) 
The cases reported in 1 U.S. (1 Dall.) come from the Pennsylvania High Court of Errors and Appeals (Pa. Ct. Err. & App.) (which from its creation in 1780 to its dissolution in 1808 was the court of last resort in the Pennsylvania judiciary); Supreme Court of Pennsylvania (Pa.); Court of Common Pleas (Pa. Ct. Com. Pl.); Pennsylvania court of Oyer and Terminer (Pa. O. & T.). (To avoid confusion, the Court of Errors and Appeals will be cited as "Pa. Ct. Err. & App." rather than as "Pa.", although the latter abbreviation should be used, according to Bluebook rules, for the highest court in Pennsylvania at a particular time. Rather, "Pa." will consistently be used to indicate the Supreme Court of Pennsylvania.)

List of cases in 1 U.S. (1 Dall.) 
Note on Respublica: A number of cases listed below include the title Respublica. Res publica is a Latin form of the term "Commonwealth," meaning in this context the "Commonwealth of Pennsylvania." Pennsylvania is one of four states (along with Massachusetts, Virginia, & Kentucky) to refer to itself as a "Commonwealth." It is interchangeable with "State." In the early 19th Century the English term Commonwealth replaced Respublica in new Pennsylvania case names.

Notes and References

External links 
  Case reports in volume 1 (1 Dall.) from Court Listener
  Case reports in volume 1 (1 Dall.) from the Caselaw Access Project of Harvard Law School
  Case reports in volume 1 (1 Dall.) from Justia
  Case reports in volume 1 (1 Dall.) from Open Jurist
 Website of the United States Supreme Court
 United States Courts website about the Supreme Court
 National Archives, Records of the Supreme Court of the United States
 American Bar Association, How Does the Supreme Court Work?
 The Supreme Court Historical Society